Nemoptera is a Palearctic genus of insects of the spoonwing family, Nemopteridae. All species are diurnal with an exclusively floral diet, preferring to fly in open spaces in full sunshine while visiting flowers. They can be recognized by their very long hind wing prolongations.

Taxonomy
The genus contains seven species, three of which are found in Europe.

 Nemoptera aegyptiaca Rambur, 1842 
 Nemoptera alba Olivier, 1811
 Nemoptera bipennis (Illiger, 1812), syn. Nemoptera lusitanica (Leach, 1815)
 Nemoptera coa (Linnaeus, 1758)
 Nemoptera orientalis Olivier in Bonnaterre et al., 1828
 Nemoptera rachelii U. Aspöck et al., 2006
 Nemoptera sinuata Olivier, 1811

The African species Nemia karrooa was formerly placed in this genus.

References

External links
 
 Taxonomicon - Genus Nemoptera

Neuroptera
Neuroptera genera